Buntrock is a surname. Notable people with the surname include: 

Bobby Buntrock (1952–1974), American child actor
Dean Buntrock (born 1931), American businessman and philanthropist
Fritz Buntrock (1909–1948), German war criminal
Sam Buntrock (born 1975), English stage director